The Basement Sublet of Horror is a self-produced Public-access television cable TV show by Joel Sanderson. The show uses a  tongue-in-cheek approach to screen altered feature films intercut with cartoons, educational and instructional videos in such a way to create a new condensed feature that collages visual puns and humorous subplots. The host of the show is the fictional Gunther Dedmund, played by Joel Sanderson.

Background 
The Basement Sublet of Horror is based on a long tradition of late-night television horror movie hosts that began in the 1950s with Vampira. Wichita, Kansas had its own horror host show, called The Host and Rodney, from the late 1950s through the 1970s starring Tom Leahy. It seems to have been the very first Horror Host show in the country, as it did not carry the "Shock Theater" package common to shows of the time, and was created from scratch by the station.

The Basement Sublet of Horror follows a long history of horror hosts that play horror films on television that have had a nationwide cult following for decades. Several generations of fans have grown up watching late-night Horror Host programs, at once becoming erstwhile film students and cinema aficionados, and also networking with other fans around the country. With the development of the Internet and cable television, horror host shows have seen a revival likened to the drive-in resurgence of indoor theaters that present exploitation.

These Horror Hosts include the likes of Ghoulardi, Elvira, and Joe Bob Briggs, who was the host of "Drive-In Theater" on Showtime, and "MonsterVision" on TNT.

Development 
The Basement Sublet of Horror first started screening in June 2006. Prior to that date, Joel Sanderson had been involved in producing live events in the Kansas area for over thirty years. His first film production was the Escape’ Drive-in which began in 1989, the show featured a combination of re-edited educational films, re-edited feature films, and live music. The show moved indoors in 1994 and became the M.T. Pockets Budget Film Festival with a three-year run at the Free state Brewery in Lawrence, Kansas, followed by a eight-year run at the Wichita Center for the Arts.

Characters 
The host of The Basement Sublet of Horror is Gunther Dedmund, a fictional character played by Joel Sanderson. Richard Wayne, another character in the show, is also played by Joel Sanderson. Several other characters have appeared in the six seasons of the show that have been broadcast so far, including several of Gunther's landlords, his boss Roger Slacks, his neighbor, a rival TV host Rusty Trees, a country western singer named Tex LeBeauf, Jake of "Jake's Mind Repair", an emergency guest host, a grave digger named Mr. Rule, an Italian movie zombie, a UFO Expert, a giant red rabbit named Rapjack Rabbit, Gunther's Aunt Ertha, Gunther's Aunt Bertha, and a ghost named Lester Jenkins.

Gunther Dedmund also likes to bring in special guest hosts that have included Ol’ Flick a classic Wichita, KS. TV host (Jim Erickson), Butch Cleaver host of "Meet Cleaver Theatre" from Cincinnati, and author Scott Phillips (The Ice Harvest, Cottonwood).

Publications 
In 2012 The Basement Sublet of Horror stepped into the world of publishing with the creation of comic books and a magazine. Both publications are related to the on-air program along with carrying the name Basement Sublet of Horror. A number of established writers and artists have contributed to the publications including Jon Niccum, Scott Philips, Rik 'Mr. Verlin' Livingston, Ben Urish, Dan Rempel, Greg Smallwood, Richard Chamberlain, and Bill Goffrier. The magazine has also featured guest appearances by television hosts and film directors including James 'Ol' Flick' Erickson, Butch R. Cleaver, Tom Leahy Jr., Andrew Rausch, and Roberta Solomon. Later issues featured interviews with artist Bradley Beard, Kansas film maker Lance Hayes, a tribute issue to director Christopher R. Mihm, and Lawrence-based science fiction author James Gunn, horror director Leif Jonker, and Kansas City horror host Crematia Mortem. The magazine was published for sixteen issues along with seven Special Editions and concluded its publication run in 2021. The special editions issues produced included a Guide to the films Boris Karloff, the films of Bela Lugosi (both written by Richard Chamberlain), a complete reprinting of the BSOH Collector Card series, a 10th-anniversary scrapbook, a guide to the films made in Kansas, a "Best of BSOH" collection, and a special mini-book re-print of issue #10 of the magazine used as the liner notes for Arrow Video's release of Leif Jonker's "Darkness".

References

External links 
 
Clip of The Basement Sublet of Horror with Gunther Dedmund at YouTube.com

Horror movie television series
American public access television shows